Major General Thomas Rhys Williams,  (10 April 1884 – 23 October 1950) was an officer in the Australian Army who held senior administrative appointments in the Second World War. Williams served as Master-General of Ordnance from the outbreak of war in 1939 until 1940, when he was appointed Chief Military Advisor to the Ministry of Munitions. Following his retirement from the army in 1944, he was the Australian representative to the Imperial War Graves Commission.

References

1884 births
1950 deaths
Military personnel from Queensland
Australian Companions of the Distinguished Service Order
Australian Companions of the Order of St Michael and St George
20th-century Australian engineers
Australian generals
Australian military personnel of World War I
Australian Army personnel of World War II
People from Bundaberg
Recipients of the Croix de guerre (Belgium)